Presidential elections were held in Liberia in May 1867. The result was a victory for James Spriggs Payne of the Republican Party, defeating Opposition Party candidate Edward James Roye. The election was very close, with the House of Representatives required to decide the final outcome.

Payne took office on 6 January 1868.

References

Liberia
1867 in Liberia
Elections in Liberia
May 1867 events
Election and referendum articles with incomplete results